Timothy Olsen (born 1989) is an American business author. He wrote  The Teenage Investor: How To Start Early, Invest Often and Build Wealth which was published by McGraw-Hill in 2003 when he was 13 years old.

Early life 
Olsen began investing at age 8 and has since become an advisor on financial matters for children and teens. He advocates an investment strategy utilizing index funds and asset allocation tailored to specific investment needs and goals. He is from Cranford, New Jersey.

He has written for a variety of sources, including IndexFunds.com, Minyanville, Morningstar.com, SageTrade.com and The Weekly Standard. He has appeared on national TV programs including CNBC's Power Lunch with Bill Griffeth, a Bloomberg Thanksgiving Day special in 2003, PBS's Nightly Business Report with Paul Kangas and FOX 5 New York's Good Day, New York.

References

External links 
"The Teenage Investor" Amazon.com 
Olsen's Blog
BookPage Interview with Timothy Olsen
PBS Nightly Business Report Interview - November 2006

Publications
The Teenage Investor: How to Start Early, Invest Often and Build Wealth 2003 

1989 births
Living people
American finance and investment writers
Louisiana State University alumni